Vladimir Vladimirovich Napolskikh (born 1 April 1963, Izhevsk, USSR) is a Russian ethnographer, ethnologist, ethnohistorian, Finno-Ugrist and linguist. Doctor of Historical Sciences (1992), Professor at Udmurt State University. Member of the «Societas Uralo-Altaica» since 2000. Corresponding Member of the Russian Academy of Sciences since 2011.

Papers in English 
 Earth-Diver Myth (А812) in northern Eurasia and North America: twenty years later
 On the literary sources of M. G. Khudiakov’s Song of Udmurt Heroes
 Review on: Eberhard Winkler, Udmurt, München 2001 (Languages of the World. Materials 212). 85 pp.
 Seven Votyak charms
 Uralic Numerals: is the evolution of numeral system reconstructable? (Reading new Václav Blažek’s book on numerals in Eurasia)

External links
 The works of Vladimir Napolskih in the Internet // Udmurtology 

1963 births
Living people
People from Izhevsk
Russian ethnographers
Linguists from Russia
Historical linguists
Russian Finno-Ugrists
20th-century Russian historians
Corresponding Members of the Russian Academy of Sciences
21st-century Russian historians